Omid Habibinia is an Iranian journalist and founder of the International Association of Iranian Journalists. He was born in Tehran in 1967 and is now living in exile in Switzerland. Habibinia has worked in media including BBC Persian, Islamic Republic of Iran Broadcasting and many banned newspapers in Iran.

External links
His blog
His articles on Gozaar
Interview on Parazit
http://www.huffingtonpost.com/2011/04/15/omid-habibinia-iranian_n_849857.html
http://www.gozaar.org/english/articles-en/Iranian-Journalism-in-the-Political-Labyrinth.html
http://www.tagesanzeiger.ch/ausland/naher-osten-und-afrika/In-Erwartung-eines-zweiten-Wunders/story/12576842
 Omid Habibinia in France 24 Observers
 Omid Habibinia in Your Middle East

Iranian political journalists
Living people
1967 births